= Pip's Island =

Pip's Island is a children's media company based in New York that produces real-life immersive experiences for young audiences. The company was founded in 2013 by siblings Rania and Rami Ajami, and Walter Krudop. After its limited pop-up engagement in Chelsea in the winter of 2016, the Pip's Island experience returned to New York City in March 2019 in a custom-built, permanent location near Times Square for an open-ended run.

== Production ==
During the experience, which lasts one hour, groups of up to fifty enter nine physical spaces, from a flying ship to a bakery, and help explorer Pip and his sidekicks, Finn and Pebble, to save the island from the villainous Joules Volter who has taken over the lighthouse, the island energy source. The audience moves through the tactile settings that combine live performance, puppets, animation and interactive challenges to complete.

== Reception ==
The show has received positive reviews in several publications including The New York Times. In 2019, the show was voted as the Best Family Show in New York by the Off-Broadway Alliance.

Pip's Island closed in 2020 prior to the COVID-19 pandemic to restructure its operations and finances. Due to the pandemic's restrictions on in-person audience attendance it was unable to reopen and the property has since been sold.
